WNBP (1450 kHz) is a commercial AM radio station licensed to Newburyport, Massachusetts, United States, and serving the Greater Boston radio market.  The station is owned by Bloomberg L.P. and serves as a simulcast of Bloomberg-programmed WRCA (AM 1330) from Watertown, Massachusetts.  WNBP and WRCA carry financial news from Bloomberg Radio.

WNBP has a power of 1,000 watts.  The transmitter is off Ferry Road in Salisbury, Massachusetts.  Its programming is simulcast on two FM translators, W291CC (106.1 MHz), transmitting from Haverhill, and W221EE (92.1 MHz) in Topsfield.

History
On March 10, 1958, WNBP signed on the air as a 500 watt daytime only station at 1470 AM, owned by Puritan Broadcasting of Lynn, Massachusetts.  (The call letters represented Newburyport.)  Puritan also owned WLYN (1360 AM) and WLYN-FM (101.7), as well as stations in Brattleboro, Vermont, and Nashua, New Hampshire.

Through the late 1970s, 1980s, and 1990s, the station changed hands several times. In 1982 the station moved to 1450 kHz, added nighttime operation and changed call letters to WCEA. In 1987 it was purchased by longtime WBZ newscaster Ted Larsen and Dan Friel for $195,000. They changed the call sign to WNCG, representing "Newburyport, The Coast and Gloucester, Your Coastal Home Companion." In 1989 they sold the station to New Hampshire broadcaster Win Damon for $425,000. He changed the call sign back to WNBP in 1991.

In 1998, Damon sold the station to Radio Newburyport LLC, owned by Robert "Doc" Fuller for $225,000. Fuller, along with partner J.J. Jeffrey, owned several other stations under their company name Fuller-Jeffrey Broadcasting. WNBP was a sole venture of Fuller with his longtime friend Al Mozier as general manager. Although J.J. Jeffrey was not part of the ownership, his voice was used for all the recorded imaging and promotional announcements. Many improvements to the station were made by Fuller and Mozier including purchasing all new studio equipment, Audisk and later Air-Traffic-Control automation, new BE-1 transmitter and installing a new tower and ground system at the transmitter site on Ferry Road in Salisbury, Massachusetts.

In September 2004, Radio Newburyport LLC (Robert Fuller, president) announced a deal had been reached to sell WNBP to Westport Communications LP (Todd Tanger, managing member) for a reported sale price of $500,000. The deal was brokered by Frank Boyle of Frank Boyle and Associates. At the time of the sale, Westport Communications owned only one other station, WBOQ (104.9 FM). WNBP's studios were relocated to nearby Beverly, Massachusetts, but the station still focused its local news and community coverage on the greater Newburyport area.

In March 2009, WNBP was sold by Westport Communications to Port Broadcasting, LLC, owned by Carl Strube, Peter Falconi and Robert Couture. The station began broadcasting from new downtown Newburyport studios at 6 Federal Street on March 13.  The format remained the same. On January 1, 2013, WNBP shifted their format from adult standards to oldies. Among WNBP's air staff were former WBOQ disc jockey Jacky Ankeles  as well as Jeff Lawrence.

On July 28, 2017, Port Broadcasting agreed to sell WNBP and W291CC to Bloomberg L.P. for $1 million; Bloomberg began operating the station under a local programming and marketing agreement on August 1. The station began to simulcast Bloomberg Radio programming with WRCA (1330 AM); that station also operates a translator at 106.1 MHz, which is required to limit its signal to the northeast of Boston to protect W291CC. As a result of the sale, WNBP's staff was let go. The sale was completed on November 28, 2017.

Translator

References

External links

NBP
Bloomberg L.P.
Business talk radio stations
Business mass media in the United States
Radio stations established in 1957
Mass media in Essex County, Massachusetts
Newburyport, Massachusetts
1957 establishments in Massachusetts